Amy Marie Hill (born May 9, 1953) is an American actress and stand-up comedian. Hill's first major role was as Yung-Hee "Grandma" Kim on All-American Girl where her character became the breakout character of the short-lived television series.

Hill has been a mainstay on American television in her work, many of her roles being major recurring roles, the most notable being: Mrs. DePaulo on That's So Raven, Mama Tohru on Jackie Chan Adventures, Mrs. Hasagawa in Lilo & Stitch: The Series (reprising the same character she played in Lilo & Stitch), Ah-Mah Jasmine Lee in The Life and Times of Juniper Lee, Judy Harvey in Enlightened, Mah Mah Ling in American Dad!, Beverly Tarantino in Mom and Ms. Mannering in Preacher.

Hill was a series regular on the Amazon Prime Video show Just Add Magic as Mama P along with recurring in Unreal as Dr. Wagerstein on the basic cable network Lifetime and The CW romantic comedy musical Crazy Ex-Girlfriend as Lourdes Chan. She also plays Teuila "Kumu" Tuileta, the cultural curator of Robin Master's estate, in the 2018 reboot series Magnum P.I.

In film, she played Mrs. Kwan in The Cat in the Hat, Sue in 50 First Dates, and Mrs. Ho-Kym in Next Friday.

Early life

Hill was born on May 9, 1953, in Deadwood, South Dakota, to Japanese national Ayako Yoneoka Hill (1914–2008) and Archie Russell Hill, a Finnish American who died after an automobile accident in 1979. She became an acclaimed actress working with the famed Asian American Theater Company in San Francisco, California. Hill is also known in the theatre world as a respected performance artist, having written and performed a number of one-woman shows, including the trilogy of Tokyo Bound, Reunion, and Beside Myself.

Career
Hill first became noticed in the industry for her involvement on Margaret Cho's short-lived sitcom All-American Girl in the role of grandmother Yung-hee, better known as Grandma or Grandma Kim. Through the run of the show her character eventually became the show's breakout character and this was noted in the show's 2006 DVD release in an interview with Hill and former co-star Margaret Cho.

Following the cancellation of All-American Girl she was cast in the role of Kay Ohara on Maybe This Time, which would eventually lead her to working and co-starring with TV legend Betty White and former All American Girl co-star Ashley Johnson.

She starred in the films Max Keeble's Big Move, Big Fat Liar, The Cat in the Hat, Let's Go To Prison, Lilo & Stitch, and as Dr. Barrenbottom in 2013's Big Gay Love, but her most well-known film role was as Sue in the film 50 First Dates.

She guest-starred on Night Court, Six Feet Under, Desperate Housewives, Two and a Half Men, King of the Hill, 3rd Rock from the Sun, The Sarah Silverman Program, and My Wife & Kids. She had recurring roles on TV shows as well, such as the lesbian daughter of D. L. Hughley's neighbor (played by Pat Morita) on The Hughleys, the upstairs neighbor of Monica and Rachel on Friends, Mrs. DePaulo on That's So Raven, Mama Tohru on Jackie Chan Adventures, Mrs. Hasagawa on Lilo & Stitch: The Series, Penny Candy on The Puzzle Place, Maureen Nervosa, the owner of Cafe Nervosa on Frasier, Mah Mah the adopted mother of Francine on American Dad!, Dr. Lauren Brown on General Hospital, and Suji on The Naked Truth. In the sixth-season finale of Seinfeld, she played the part of Frank Costanza's long-lost girlfriend during his Korean War service. She played Pang Bing, the final antagonist of the series finale of Kung Fu Panda: Legends of Awesomeness.

She had regular roles on Strip Mall and as "Ah-Mah" Jasmine Lee on The Life and Times of Juniper Lee. Hill has recurring roles as Beverley on Mom and Ms. Mannering on Preacher.

Filmography

Film

Television

Awards and nominations
 Hill was nominated for a regional Emmy (Los Angeles Area) as writer/host of Get Real, an Asian-American teen talk show on KSCI.

References

External links
 
 

1953 births
Living people
20th-century American actresses
21st-century American actresses
Actresses from South Dakota
American actresses of Japanese descent
American dramatists and playwrights of Japanese descent
American women dramatists and playwrights
American film actresses
American film actors of Asian descent
American people of Finnish descent
American performance artists
American television actresses
American theatre directors of Japanese descent
American voice actresses
People from Deadwood, South Dakota